Capper–Volstead Act (P.L. 67-146), the Co-operative Marketing Associations Act (7 U.S.C. 291, 292) was adopted by the United States Congress on February 18, 1922. It gave “associations” of persons producing agricultural products certain exemptions from antitrust laws. It is sometimes called the Magna Carta of cooperatives.

Origins
The law was passed in response to challenges made  against cooperatives using the Sherman Act (15 U.S.C. 1 et seq.), the Clayton Antitrust Act  (15 U.S.C. 12 et seq.), and the Federal Trade Commission Act (15 U.S.C. 41 et seq.). As a consequence of the depression of agricultural prices subsequent to World War I, farm organizations intensified their drive for government aid and managed to get a farm bloc established in Congress. Senator Arthur Capper was a member of this bloc and the Capper–Volstead Act was a part of the farm legislative program. (The law carries the names of its sponsors, Senator Arthur Capper of Kansas and Representative Andrew Volstead of Minnesota.)

Content
The act authorized various kinds of agricultural producers to form voluntary co-operative associations for purposes of producing, handling, and marketing farm products. It therefore exempted such associations from the application of the antitrust laws. The United States Secretary of Agriculture was given power, on his own motion, to prevent such associations from achieving and maintaining monopolies. He could hold hearings, determine facts, and issue orders, which were ultimately subject to review by federal district courts.

References

Dictionary of American History by James Truslow Adams, New York: Charles Scribner's Sons, 1940
CRS Report for Congress: Agriculture: A Glossary of Terms, Programs, and Laws, 2005 Edition - Order Code 97-905

External links
 Capper-Volstead Act, as amended, in HTML/PDF/details in the GPO Statute Compilations collection
US Code Title 7, Section 291 & 292 (from GPOaccess.gov)
The Capper-Volstead Act: Opportunity Today and Tomorrow / In Commemoration of the 75th Anniversary of the Capper-Volstead Act by Donald M. Barnes and Christopher E. Ondeck—a paper on the Act from the University of Wisconsin Center for Cooperatives site

1922 in law
67th United States Congress
United States federal agriculture legislation
United States federal antitrust legislation
Agricultural economics